Government Science College, Chatrapur is an Indian public college. It is located at Chatrapur, Ganjam in the Indian state of Orissa. It affiliated with Khallikote University in 2015 and Council of Higher Secondary Education Odisha.

History
The College was established in 1969 as a Private College at the Ganjam District Headquarters. It was taken over by the Government on 10 July 1982. It became a lead college of the state in 1993. It became accredited at the 'B' level by the National Assessment and Accreditation Council (NAAC) in 2006.

Description
The College offers streams of Science, Commerce, and Arts for undergraduate  and graduate programs. It educates 12 to +3 Pass and Hons. in Arts, Science and Commerce. Postgraduate courses are offered in History and Oriya. For the graduate program, Science offers 64 seats, Arts 96, and Commerce 32. Postgraduate programmes in History and Oriya feature 16 and 8 seats, respectively, The college has a library, as well as NCC and Scout facilities. Separate rooms are available for males and females. More than 900 undergraduate, graduate & post-graduate students enroll. The college celebrated its silver jubilee in 2018.

Departments
The college runs Science, Arts, and Commerce streams.

Faculty of Science

 Physics
 Chemistry
 Mathematics
 Botany
 Zoology.

Faculty Of Arts

 English
 Economics
 Education
 History
 Mathematics
 Oriya
 Political science
 Psychology
 Statistics

Faculty Of Commerce

 Commerce

References

Universities and colleges in Odisha
Ganjam district
Educational institutions established in 1969
1969 establishments in Orissa